Bothrocolpodes is a genus of beetles in the family Carabidae, containing the following species:

 Bothrocolpodes fossulatus (Jeannel, 1948)
 Bothrocolpodes manjarivoloanus Basilewsky, 1985
 Bothrocolpodes rudis (Alluaud, 1909)
 Bothrocolpodes splendens Basilewsky, 1985

References

Platyninae